The Univox Super-Fuzz was a fuzzbox produced by the Univox company, primarily for use with the electric guitar or bass.

History

Origin
The circuit was designed in the late 1960s by the Japanese company Honey, in the form of a multi effect called the Honey Psychedelic Machine. Later on, Honey was taken on by Shin-ei, who produced the effect separately (who also produced another well known fuzz box, the Shin-ei Companion FY-2) and imported in the USA by Unicord.  The first Super-Fuzzes were made in 1968, and production continued until the late 70s.

Design
The first units were made in a simple stamped sheet metal box, painted grey, with a blue metal Univox sticker on the top. Around 1970 production was changed to a die-cast metal box, with a large pedal featuring a rubber cover that had the words "Super-Fuzz" embossed on it. The first die cast units were either grey or black, with a green or black foot pedal. Around 1973 or so, they were all produced with an orange pedal, with a green or blue foot pedal. The later models also featured an internal trim pot for controlling the octave balance.

Alternative manufacturers
Although the Univox units are the most well-known incarnation of this circuit, Shin-ei licensed this circuit out to dozens of manufacturers.

Sound
This fuzz is an octave fuzz using two germanium diodes to produce square wave clipping. 

The controls are 'Balance' (volume), 'Expander' (fuzz amount), a two position 'tone' switch, and an on/off footswitch on top. 

There are two unique features of this device that set it apart from other distortion and fuzz pedals. The first is that the full-wave rectification of the circuit produces an upper octave as well as a slight lower octave. This also gives the sound a lot of compression and gives a mild ring modulator effect. The second unique feature is a tone switch that engages a 1kHz filter that "scoops" the mids, giving a very fat, almost bassy tone, unique to this circuit.

Super-Fuzz users
Notable musicians who have used the Super-Fuzz include:
 Adam Yauch of Beastie Boys
 Billy Corgan of Smashing Pumpkins
 Billy Cox of Jimi Hendrix
 Chris Walla of Death Cab for Cutie
 Elliott Frazier of Ringo Deathstarr
 Gary Louris of The Jayhawks
 Hillel Slovak of Red Hot Chili Peppers
 J Mascis of Dinosaur Jr.
 Joe Denardo of Growing
 Jon Niederbrach of The Untold Fables
 Joe Preston of Thrones
 Josh Homme of Them Crooked Vultures, Queens of the Stone Age and Kyuss
 Jus Oborn of Electric Wizard
 Kurt Cobain of Nirvana 
 Mark Arm and Steve Turner of Mudhoney
 Pete Townshend of The Who
 Poison Ivy of The Cramps
 Scott Hill of Fu Manchu
 Steve Hackett of Genesis (rebranded as the Shaftesbury Duo-Fuzz)
 Dave Stewart of Hatfield and the North (rebranded as the Shaftesbury Duo-Fuzz)
 Tony McPhee of The Groundhogs
 Paul Vinegar of Jahbulong
 Josh Hamby of From Zero To Zed

References

External links
 Effects Database page on the Super-Fuzz
 Coda Effects post about the history of the Super Fuzz

Effects units